The Max Born Award is given by the Optical Society (formerly the Optical Society of America) for "outstanding contributions to physical optics", and is named after Max Born.

Recipients
Source: The Optical Society

 2022 Yuri Kivshar
 2021 Anne L'Huillier
 2020 Nader Engheta 
 2019 Govind P. Agrawal 
 2018 Demetrios N. Christodoulides
 2017 Miles J. Padgett
 2016 Xiang Zhang
 2015 John D. Joannopoulos 
 2014 Costas Soukoulis
 2013 
 2012 Jean Dalibard
 2011 Carlton M. Caves
 2010 Vladimir M. Shalaev
 2009 
 2008 Peter W. Milonni
 2007 Luigi Lugiato
 2006 Richart Elliott Slusher
 2005 
 2004 David E. Pritchard
 2003 Howard Carmichael
 2002 John L. Hall
 2001 Bernard Yurke
 2000 
 1999 Alain Aspect
 1998 Peter Zoller
 1997 Boris Zeldovich
 1996 H. Jeffrey Kimble
 1995 
 1994 
 1992 Rodney Loudon
 1991 James P. Gordon
 1990 
 1989 
 1988 Girish Saran Agarwal
 1987 Emil Wolf
 1986 Herch Moysés Nussenzveig
 1985 Roy J. Glauber
 1984 
 1983 Joseph W. Goodman
 1982 Leonard Mandel

See also

 List of physics awards

References

External links
 Max Born Award, The Optical Society

Awards of Optica (society)
Max Born